Hats may refer to:

Hat, an item of clothing worn on a person's head
Hats (party), an 18th-century political faction in Sweden
Hats (album), an album by the British pop group The Blue Nile
"Hats", a song from Heart in Motion, a 1992 album by American singer Amy Grant

Histone acetyltransferases (HATs), enzymes linked to transcriptional activation

de Bono Hats, the thinking strategies outlined by Edward de Bono in Six Thinking Hats

Hi-hat (instrument), a standard part of a drum kit

See also 
 Hat (disambiguation)
 Hatt (disambiguation)
 Het (disambiguation)
 Hett (disambiguation)
 High hat (disambiguation)